Arthur Sydney Rowe (1 September 1906 – 5 November 1993) was an English footballer, and later manager, who played as a centre half. He was the first manager to lead Tottenham Hotspur to the First Division Championship title in 1951. He also "invented" the successful "one-two" method of play.

Playing career 
Rowe was born in Tottenham and began his career at Tottenham Hotspur's nursery club Northfleet United as an amateur in 1923, before becoming a professional with "Spurs" in 1929. He also appeared as an amateur for Cheshunt in 1920. He was a Tottenham player for eight seasons, after making his debut in 1931, in which time he played 201 games, in all competitions, and earned his single cap for the England team. He was forced to retire in 1939 due to a cartilage injury.

Managerial career

Chelmsford City
After finishing his career as a player, Rowe took a coaching job in Hungary although this was halted due to the outbreak of World War II. He returned to Britain and joined the military as a physical training instructor. He joined Chelmsford City, as secretary-manager, in 1945 and made the club into a leading non-league team.

Tottenham Hotspur
Tottenham Hotspur were in the second division when Rowe returned to the club as manager in 1949 and his task was to gain promotion. This was achieved by becoming Champions and the following season the First Division Championship was won as well. These back-to-back championships made Spurs the first post-war team to win back-to-back titles. This was achieved through the use of 'Push and run' football.

Rowe was forced to resign as Tottenham manager in 1955 due to health issues.

Crystal Palace
After leaving Tottenham, Rowe took time off to recover and joined Crystal Palace in November 1958 as an assistant to George Smith. He was promoted to manager when Smith resigned in April 1960 bringing the club a promotion to Division Three in the 1960–61 season. The club consolidated its position in Division Three in 1961–62, but a poor start to the next season coincided with failing health for Rowe and he resigned in December 1962 to be replaced by assistant manager Dick Graham. Rowe returned to assist Graham in the 1963–64 season (when Palace was promoted to Division Two) and when Graham was dismissed by Palace in 1966, Rowe was appointed caretaker-manager. After Bert Head was appointed as manager later in 1966, Rowe continued with Palace in a scouting capacity. He subsequently managed the Hall of Fame in London and also assisted Leyton Orient briefly in 1972.

Rowe died on 5 November 1993 in Wallington, aged 87.

Career statistics

International

Honours

As a manager
Tottenham Hotspur
Football League First Division: 1950–51
Football League Second Division: 1949–50
FA Charity Shield: 1951

References

External links

Profile on englandfootballonline.com

See also 
 List of English football championship winning managers

1906 births
Footballers from Tottenham
1993 deaths
English footballers
England international footballers
English football managers
Tottenham Hotspur F.C. players
Tottenham Hotspur F.C. managers
Crystal Palace F.C. managers
Cheshunt F.C. players
Chelmsford City F.C. managers
Association football defenders
Association football coaches